Pope John Senior High School and Minor Seminary (formerly St John's Seminary and College, nicknamed POJOSS), is an all-boys boarding school, located at Effiduase, Koforidua, in the Eastern Region of Ghana. It was established in 1958 by Bishop Joseph Oliver Bowers SVD as a Catholic seminary for boys who wished to become priests. Students are offered courses such as general arts, general science, business and visual arts to pursue and after their stay in the school, sit an external examination called the West African Senior School Certificate Examination to be placed in any of the tertiary institutions in the country.

The students of the school are usually referred to as Pojomma while the alumni are addressed as Pojoba, to which they respond Daasebre. Since its establishment in 1958, the school has achieved many successes and has produced great men for Ghana and the world over. There are about 2100 boys in the school.

History 

On 8 November 1953, Bishop Joseph Oliver Bowers SVD, Catholic Bishop of the then Diocese of Accra, now Roman Catholic Archdiocese of Accra came to the New Juabeng Traditional Area in Eastern Region, Ghana on his first pastoral visit. He held discussions with Nana Frempong Mposo II, chief of the area, which led to the Roman Catholic Church mission acquiring land at Effiduase in Koforidua. Father Anthony Bauer and Fr. Henk Janseen were then asked to survey the land and their report was favorable. Early in 1955, Bishop J. O. Bowers decided to build a junior seminary for the Diocese of Accra on that land. In January 1955, Fr. Jude SVD, Dr. Balduricus and Dr. Lucian Orians came to construct the first buildings, one classroom block and a combined Fathers' residence and administrative block. In early 1957, Dr. Damian Brockmann SVD constructed the first Science Block. Today in its place stands a students' dormitory called Elsbend House, named after the first headmaster. In October 1957, Bishop Bowers appointed Rev. Fr. Alphonse Elsbend as the first Headmaster and Seminary Rector, assisted by Rev. John O'Sullivan and Rev. Joseph Skorupka and Bismark Sosu. The school's chapel was constructed the following year in 1958.

Opening 

On 21 January 1958, St. John's Seminary and College officially opened with 45 students; 14 seminarians and 31-day students in two forms. One Ghanaian lay teacher, Mr. Paul Ohene-Boakye was employed to help the 3 SVD priests who had been appointed by the Bishop to teach and instruct the young boys in their academic work, moral and religious lives. In June 1958, electricity was extended to the school at the cost of 45 pounds. On 20 July 1961, the first Speech and Prize-Giving Day was held. The Guest Speaker was Rev. Maurice Lesage SVD. M.SC., then headmaster of St. Thomas Aquinas Senior High School in Accra, and the distribution of prizes was done by Nana Frempong Mposo II, chief of Effiduase. The school's enrollment at this time was 23 Seminarians and 90-day students, totaling 113 students. Pius Kpeglo (now a catholic retired Monsignor), Senior Prefect of the seminary and school, was successful in his G.C.E. examinations, and left on Scholarship on 7 August 1961 to do Philosophy and Theology at the Diocesan Seminary in Regensburg, Germany.

Change of name and absorption into the public education system 

From 1958 to 1968, St. John's College operated as a private Catholic institution financed by the Catholic Diocese of Accra and by the school fees of the few students. Due to the high cost of running the school, Father Fredrischs, the second Headmaster, with the approval of Bishop Bowers, applied for incorporation into the Public Education System of the Ministry of Education of Ghana. On 1 September 1968, St. John Seminary and College was absorbed into the Ghana Education Service of the Ministry of Education (Ghana) as a government-assisted secondary school. The name of the school was changed to Pope John Secondary School and Junior Seminary to avoid confusion with other Catholic Schools in Ghana already designated "St. John". The name Pope John was chosen in memory of Pope John XXIII who had just convened the Second Vatican Council, and to keep the identity and purpose of the former St. John's College. The 2007 Ghana education reform under the John Kufuor administration saw the school re-designated Pope John Senior High School and Minor Seminary.

Growth and development 

The mustard seed which the Society of the Divine Word (SVD) Fathers of the Catholic Church sowed under the supervision of Bishop Bowers has hence seen remarkable growth and development.
In July 1992 the Roman Catholic Diocese of Koforidua was erected, giving it autonomy from the now Metropolitan Roman Catholic Archdiocese of Accra. Most. Rev. Dr. Charles G. Palmer-Buckle became the first bishop of the new diocese. The management of Pope John Senior High School and Minor Seminary thus became the responsibility of the Roman Catholic Diocese of Koforidua within the Ecclesiastical Province of Accra. Today, there is a professional teaching staff of 92 and a non-teaching staff of 85. There are over 2000 boarding students with a little under 100 seminarians. Pope John Secondary School now ranks as one of the best in Ghana, making its mark on all fronts; academics, sport, music, discipline, among others.

More than 8,000 students have passed through the classrooms and examination halls of Pope John Senior High School and Minor Seminary. Over 100 of its former students who have been ordained as priests for the Catholic Church, including Archbishop Charles G. Palmer-Buckle. Others have become pastors for other churches and many more can be found in all spheres of life both on the local and international job market, contributing in diverse ways to the development of humanity.

School anthem 
 After years of existence without any official school anthem, Rev. Fr. Burke SVD (headmaster from 1985 to 1995) began the process for the school acquiring one. This was also partly influenced by the fact that though a young institution, Pojoss had already begun to claim many laurels and perform excellently on the educational scene of Ghana. In 1997, he asked a student, who was also a member of the school choir to compose an anthem for the school. The student was Master Anthony Barnieh. Anthony's composition ("O Great Pojomma Arise and Shine") was submitted and was immediately adopted as the official school anthem. It was first performed by the school's choir in 1998. Today Mr. Barnieh is a teacher of social sciences in Pope John and the music director for the school choir and all musical groups in the school. Additionally, he is the founder and director of one of the best choirs in Ghana.

Early in the first decade of the twenty-first century, the monument of the Sacred Heart was dedicated to the Sacred Heart of Jesus under the chaplaincy of Rev. Fr. Justine Mensah and Master Emmanuel Obeng Codjoe (now a Catholic priest). The need for a song to the Sacred Heart arose and this was the ode chosen to pay respect to Jesus Christ. History, however, indicates that it was composed and used as an anthem by the school long before the introduction of "O Great Pojomma Arise and Shine". The two songs of Pope John have become associated with all meetings and gatherings concerning the school or its alumni (notable among which are the opening and closing masses), and have been incorporated into a hymnal for students. Other songs related to students’ life on campus include the famous Father Burke hits: "Life in this world is a great struggle", "I danced in the morning" and "We are going".

School attire 

Christened the "Reflector", the school's uniform is a yellow shirt and blue pair of trousers or shorts which may be worn with the school's tie and blazer. The yellow shirt are mostly worn over a pair of shorts. Only form 3 or final year students are allowed to wear a pair of trousers. Other uniforms include the school cloth and the Friday African print wear. House jerseys are worn for sports and every house has its own color.

Culture 

Pope John Senior High School maintains a very strong Roman Catholic culture which underpins almost all activities. It is by convention that appointment of the head of the school and key student leaders such as the senior prefect, student's chaplain and their assistants belong to the Catholic faith. Founders' Day Mass is celebrated annually all over the country and in the school. There are administrative student units independent of each other. These assist the school's administration in governing the student body and maintaining discipline. They are; The Students' Representative Council (SRC), The Prefectorial Board, The Editorial Board, The Entertainment Board, The Chaplaincy Board and The School Cadet.

Academic departments 

Academic activities of the school are structured into departments are headed by heads-of-department who are directly responsible to the assistant headmaster academics. They are the departments of General Science, General Arts, Business, and Visual Arts.

Curriculum 

POJOSS follows the Ghanaian educational Senior High School curriculum, operating in a three-year academic cycle, from form one to form three. Students are taught throughout the year, over a period of three academic terms. The first term of the academic year marks the enrollment of form one students to the school while the third term marks the graduation of form three students. The programmes run by the school include General Science, General Arts, Business and Visual Arts. Form one applicants select four Elective courses. Unlike Elective courses, core courses are offered to all students, irrespective of their programme of study. The core courses in the school are: English language, core mathematics, social studies, integrated science, ICT and physical education, however, students are only examined externally, in the first five aforementioned courses. There are subjects taught which are unique to the school because of its attachment to a seminary. They are Religion, Doctrine studies, Latin and Music.

Facilities 

Pope John Senior High School and Minor Seminary has an ultramodern Science laboratory, a state of the arts I.C.T center, a library, a multipurpose athletic field, a basketball and volleyball court, among a host of others.

The school's Parent Teacher Association (PTA), the SRC, Roman Catholic Church and the POJOBA have contributed to the development of these facilities in the school. The school's administration makes sure that these facilities are effectively used to enhance teaching and learning in the school.

Chaplaincy 

Pope John Senior High School and Minor Seminary has a vibrant chaplaincy headed by a chaplain who is appointed by the Archbishop of Accra. Among other things, the POJOSS chaplaincy is the headquarters for religious groups like the Catholic Students Union (CASU), Legion of Mary, Eastern Region and the Sacred Heart Confraternity in the Eastern Region.

It, therefore, sees to the organization of the St. Thomas Aquinas Day celebrations and Kwahu-Tafo pilgrimage held annually in the Eastern Region. The chaplaincy is currently headed by Rev. Fr. Joel Yao Kwame of the Roman Catholic Archdiocese of Accra.

Annual events 

Throughout the school's academic season, events are held to enhance the formation of students in addition to academic work. They are as follows:

Founders' Day celebrations 

Each year on 21 August, a Holy Mass is held in memory of the founding fathers of the school. It is celebrated by the Alumni of the school at the Holy Spirit Cathedral in the Roman Catholic Archdiocese of Accra, and by the students at school. Holy Mass precedes the celebrations and in Accra, is said by all alumni-priests of the school.

Homecoming Reunion 

This event brings together all alumni of Pojoss at the school for fun games. During this event, old boys deliver motivational talks to the students.

Speech and Prize-Giving Day 

A speech and prize-giving day is held to award long-serving teachers and students who have excelled in all areas of their formation; academic work, sports and social life.

SRC Symposium and Funfair 

This event is organized by the student administrative unit to bring together all sister schools and schools within the locality for educational symposiums, entertainment jams and socialization. Occasionally, schools from the Greater Accra Region, Ashanti Region and Volta Region are invited. The event is given a unique name by each group of administrators every year.

St. Thomas Aquinas Day celebrations 

Also known in student circles as Tom Aqua, it is organized by the chaplaincy of the school. It brings together all Catholic students within the Eastern Region to honor their patron saint, St. Thomas Aquinas and discuss matters affecting them.
Under the 2001/2002 executives of the Koforidua Diocese Catholic Students Union (KODCASU) the St. Thomas Aquinas Day was institutionalized. The first was organized on 2 February 2002 at the St. George's Cathedral, Koforidua. The main celebrant of the Holy Mass was Most Rev Charles Gabriel Palmer-Buckle, then Bishop of Koforidua. Notable among the students were Mr. Emmanuel Obeng Codjoe (now Rev. Fr. Emmanuel Obeng Codjoe) who was the Students' Chaplain of Pope John at the time.

Inter-house athletics 

This event is organized by the Sports Department to award students who distinguish themselves in field and track events. It also serves as an avenue for sport boys to be picked in representing the school at National Athletic Competitions.

Elections 

General elections are organized every year to select new prefects and student administrators for the SRC.

Campus 

There are staff bungalows and teachers' flats where instructors of the students reside. There is also a Fathers' residence which hosts the school's chaplain and other priests of the Roman Catholic Diocese of Koforidua.

Houses 
There are currently seven houses available for boarding students who require a stay throughout a term:
Pope John Seminary (Pope john House)
Bishop Bowers House
Nana Frempong Mposo House
Alphonse Elsbernd House
Paul Boakye House
Fr. Amos Fredric's House
Most Rev. Leon Badikebele Kalenga House.

Academic performance 

 Pope John Senior High School and Minor Seminary maintains a very high academic standard and has over the years distinguished itself in the areas of Science, Business, and Arts. In 2012, the school placed 9th on the WASSCE order of merit (Education in Koforidua), and has emerged victorious in many inter-school academic competitions. A survey indicates that Pojoss contributes over 60% of its students to tertiary institutions around the globe every year. Also, in 2015, Pope John Senior High School came 1st in the WASSCE rankings.

Awards and recognition 

VALCO Soccer Tournament (1999) (Winner)
National Independence Debate Championship (2000) (Winner)
Milo Schools Soccer Championship (2001) (Winner)
National Science and Maths Quiz (2001) (Winner)
VALCO Soccer Tournament (2002) (Winner)
Microsoft Internet Safety and Security Focus On Ghana (MISSFoG) National Quiz Contest (2009) (Winner)
Junior Achievement Barclays Bank Chairman Awards (2009) (Placed Second)
Project Citizen National Showcase (2011) (Placed 3rd)
Ghana Youth Forum Debate (2012) (Winner)
National Independence Debate Championship (2013) (Winner)
National Independence Debate Championship (2015) (Winner)
National Independence Debate Championship (2017) (runners up)(2nd)
Sharks Quiz Season 2 (2nd)

Notable teachers 

Mr Emmanuel Agyepong (Received 3rd Prize for National Best Teacher Award 2001)
Most Reverend Charles G. Palmer-Buckle (former chaplain and teacher)
Mr. Yaw Gyebi (Received 2nd Prize National Best Teacher Award)
Mr. Isaac Amanor(Geography department)

Mr. Patrick Larbi Lartey (former Senior House Master and Teacher)
Mr Eric Bempoe (Senior House Master)
Benedicta Foli (Former Headmistress)

Clubs and societies 

Students of Pope John Senior High School and Minor Seminary are involved in Extracurricular activities through their membership in clubs and societies. This has brought out the talents in many of the students and has been used in securing victories for the school through debates, quizzes and boot camps. They include:
Science and Maths Club (PJSMC)
Literary and drama club
School Choir
Civic Education Club
Child's Right International
Mystical Vibes
Olympic Club
GUNSA
Future Leaders Investment Club (FLIC)
SYTO
FRENCH Club
Catholic Students' Union (CASU)
American Field Service (AFS)
Legion of Mary
Knights of the Altar
Air force Cadet
Red Cross Society
Art Renaissance Club
Pope John InfoTech Club
Junior Achievement Company
Students' Representative Council (SRC)
School Brass Band
Scholarship and Talent Club
Business club (GNABS, POJOSS)

Student Representative Council 

Due to the large size of the school and student body, administration has been decentralized to the students level to ensure the maintenance of high standard of discipline in the school. At the helm of student administration is the Students' Representative Council, headed by a President with two assistants who perform the role of Senior Prefects as well.

All other student groups, clubs and societies fall under the SRC and are accountable to its president. Among other things, the SRC ensures the maintenance of discipline among students and promotes a good student-administration forum.

It has over the years, also contributed to the development of amenities and infrastructure on the school's campus. Notable among these are the Visitors' Lounge and students' bath house. It is currently headed by Master Franklin Amoh

POJOSS and Society 

The Pope John community has through the decades maintained a very cordial relationship with society, especially with the Roman Catholic Church, the town of Effiduase in Koforidua and sister schools across Ghana.

Alliances

POJOROSA 

POJOROSA is the acronym representing the alliance between Pope John Senior High School and Minor Seminary and St. Roses Senior High School. This alliance has been made manifest in the marriages of alumni of the two schools. Teachers from St. Roses have taught in Pojoss and vice versa. Alumni from Pojoss have also returned the gesture and taught in St. Roses. Annual programmes organized by the two schools are often well attended by students of the schools as a gesture of the friendliness they bear toward each other. Apart from all these, Pope John and Saint Roses share the same heritage in their founding fathers, the SVD missionaries.

But now it is POJOKRO. It is the collaboration with Pojoss students and Krobo girls. The bond has been a strong bond for the past years. Pope John Senior High School and minor seminary teachers teach in Krobo senior high school and vice versa.

POJOKRO 

POJOSS' relationship with Krobo Girls' Senior High School has also resulted in the birth of POJOKRO: Though many see this as an impossible alliance owing to the fact that Krobo Girls' is a Presbyterian school, the students have often tried to breach that divide by inviting students of Krobo Girls' to some of their annual programmes.

The Roman Catholic Church 

The church maintains a cordial relationship with Pojoss. Many of the school's alumni have become Roman Catholic priests for the dioceses all over Ghana. The school's boys' choir has performed at many Catholic events including the burial mass of their founder, Joseph Bowers. Catholic programmes are often held in Pope John, notable among which is the Sacred Heart Congress.

Electoral Commission of Ghana 

Pojoss remains a polling station where elections in Ghana are concerned. Members of the school staff are often employed as polling officials in every general election of the country.

The University of Education, Winneba 

The academic campus of Pope John Senior High School and Minor Seminary is used weekly as a weekend campus for Koforidua-resident distant learners offering courses at the university. Some of the school's teaching staff also give tuition at these weekend lectures.

Affiliations

The Roman Catholic Church 

The establishment of Pope John was a vision initiated by the Roman Catholic church. It is therefore known as a Catholic school. The seminary continues to receive funding from the church to support the formation of seminarians.

Kwame Nkrumah University of Science and Technology 

There is an informal relationship with KNUST. Most of the university's senior lecturers including its immediate past vice chancellor are alumni of Pope John. Additionally, a considerable number of alumni are enrolled in KNUST annually. In 2012 under the Community Impact Program, KNUST donated books to the school's library and supervised the renovation of its science lab.

Rivalry 
There exists a friendly rivalry between Pope John Senior High and St. Peter's Boys Senior Secondary School, Nkwatia. Inter-school programmes are therefore held termly to promote unity and cordiality among students of the two institutions.

Chronology of headmasters

Notable alumni

Clergy 
 Archbishop Charles G. Palmer- Buckle, Metropolitan Archbishop of Cape Coast

Politics, government, and public policy 
 Samuel Nuamah Donkor, Former MP for New Juaben North, Minister of Health and Ashanti Regional Minister
 Edward Omane Boamah, Former Minister of Communications
 Ebenezer Okletey Terlabi, MP for Lower Manya Krobo and Former Deputy Minister of Defence
 Kojo Oppong Nkrumah, Minister of Information and MP for Ofoasi/Ayirebi
Franklin Cudjoe, Founder and President of IMANI Centre for Policy and Education

Law enforcement 
 Joseph Boateng Danquah, Former Chief of Defense Staff (CDS) of the Ghana Armed Forces and Member of Council of State
 Major General William Omane Agyekum, Commandant of Military Academy and Training Schools
 Brigadier General Kweku Asamoah Yeboah, Director General of International Peace Support Operations, Ghana Armed Forces

Academia 
 William Otoo Ellis, former Vice Chancellor of KNUST

Corporate, business, and finance 
Maxwell Opoku-Afari, Economist and first Deputy Governor of the Bank of Ghana.

Arts and entertainment 

 D-Black, Hip-hop star and entrepreneur
 Ibrahim Mahama (artist), Author and Artist of monumental installations

See also
 Ministry of Education (Ghana)
 List of senior secondary schools in Ghana
 Joseph Oliver Bowers
 List of schools in Ghana

References

External links

 
 
 Ghana Catholic Bishops Conference
 
 
 http://www.ghanaschoolsnet.com/group/popejohnseniorhighschool/forum/topics/prominent-old-boys
 http://www.ghana.gov.gh/index.php/about-ghana/ghana-at-a-glance/56th-independence/20292-pope-johns-senior-high-wins-16th-interschools-debate|publisher=Ghana Government|accessdate=5 March 2013
 http://cbcgha.org/cbc/index.php?option=com_content&view=article&id=179&Itemid=322
 

Christian educational institutions
Catholic minor seminaries
Catholic secondary schools in Ghana
1958 establishments in Ghana
Educational institutions established in 1958
Education in the Eastern Region (Ghana)